Jarząbka  is a village in the administrative district of Gmina Wąsewo, within Ostrów Mazowiecka County, Masovian Voivodeship, in east-central Poland.

History
During the German occupation of Poland (World War II), on August 29, 1944, the village was the site of a battle between the underground Polish Home Army and German troops. It ended in a Polish victory. Four Poles were killed and two were wounded in the battle. In retaliation for the battle, the Germans committed pacifications of nearby villages of Małaszek, Plewki and Lipniak-Majorat, killing around 500 Poles.

References

Villages in Ostrów Mazowiecka County